D3D may refer to:

 DIII-D (tokamak) (pronounced 'D3D'), a tokamak located at San Diego, California
 Direct3D, Microsoft's graphics rendering scheme
 Dolby 3D
 Duke Nukem 3D or Duke3d, a first person shooter video game from 1996
 China Railways HXD3D, a type of electric locomotive in China